Caliprobola is a genus of Hoverflies, from the family Syrphidae, in the order Diptera.

Species
C. aurea Sack, 1910
C. speciosa (Rossi, 1790)

References

Hoverfly genera
Taxa named by Camillo Rondani
Diptera of Asia
Diptera of Europe
Eristalinae